Fall Creek is a neighborhood in Ithaca, New York, located on the northern side of the city.

References

Ithaca, New York